Euphydryas editha luestherae, or LuEsther's checkerspot, is a butterfly native to the U.S. state of California that is included in the brush-footed butterfly family Nymphalidae and the tribe Melitaeini.  It is a subspecies of Edith's checkerspot (Euphydryas editha), and it was described in 1980 by Dennis D. Murphy and Paul R. Ehrlich. The common and scientific names honor LuEsther Mertz.

References

Butterflies of North America
Euphydryas
Butterfly subspecies